The Ashkali, also Hashkali, and Balkan Egyptians are Albanian-speaking Albanized ethnic cultural minorities (recognized communities), unrelated to each other, which mainly inhabit Kosovo, and in the case of Balkan Egyptians: Albania, Montenegro, North Macedonia and Southern Serbia (geographical region) as well. Prior to the Kosovo War of 1999, the Balkan Egyptians or Ashkali people registered themselves as Albanians.

During the Kosovo War, Kosovo's Ashkali people were displaced as refugees in Albania, Serbia and Macedonia and the whole of Western Europe, such as Germany and France. The Ashkali identity was created in 1999, as they tried to show their pro-Albanian stance and distinguish themselves from the Roma.

History

The origins of the Balkan Egyptians are obscure. It is said that the Ashkali people claim they have originated in Persia, in 4th century BC (Ashkal, Gilan, Iran).
But some Balkan historians trace the origin of Balkan Egyptians to the Iron Age, citing vague references in Herodotus of the presence of Khener, an Ancient Egyptians dance group in the region. They also attribute archaeological structures in the area, notably in modern Ohrid and Bitola, as temples of the Goddess Isis, but the Mysteries of Isis was widespread in the Greco-Roman world. It is also possible, that the Balkan Egyptians are traces back to the Doms in Egypt, other versions are, that after the Ottoman–Egyptian invasion of Mani, Egyptian soldiers went to Albania and become the ancestors. However, historians maintain that during the Ottoman era the 'Balkan Egyptians' and other Balkan Roma were part of a single community, who called by the Ottomans Kıbti (literally 'Copts', reflecting the same group encompassed by the English ethnonym for the Roma, ('Gypsies'). They see the alternative origins as part of a larger phenomenon whereby groups such as the Ashkali and Balkan Egyptians, as part of an effort to achieve greater civil emancipation and to escape anti-Roma prejudice, made an effort to separate themselves from other Roma and constructed a novel history for their peoples.

A 14th-century reference to a placename (Агѹповы клѣти, Agupovy klěti) in the Rila Charter of Ivan Alexander of Bulgaria was thought by some authors, such as Konstantin Josef Jireček, to be related to the Balkan Egyptians, possible descendants from the Doms in Egypt.

In 1990, an "Egyptian association" was formed in Ohrid, North Macedonia, which was attended by representatives from different Balkan countries.

The Ashkali and the Kosovo War
During the Kosovo War, Albanized Roma were displaced as refugees in Albania and the Republic of Macedonia. Albanized Roma formed the ethnic group Ashkali after the end of the war in 1999, to show their pro-Albanian stance and distinguish themselves from the Arlije and Gurbeti Roma, who had been mistakenly viewed as pro-Serbian during the war. Many Albanized Roma were also sent to refugee camps with other Romani people in Kosovo, with whom they did not share the same language and customs. As the majority of Kosovo (or Albanized) Roma, many Ashkali refugees settled in Serbia and Montenegro.
The first Ashkali party (Democratic Party of the Ashkali Albanians of Kosovo) was formed in 2000 under Sabit Rrahmani, who supported Kosovo independence in the name of all Ashkali.

In Kosovo, the Ashkali were aligned with Albanians before, during and after the Kosovo War.  However, Ashkali, along with Romani people in Kosovo, have reportedly been expelled from the area.

Demographics
Most Ashkali live in Kosovo and North Macedonia, but they also reside in Serbia and Montenegro, while most Balkan Egyptians are thought to live in Albania, other than Kosovo. In the Macedonian census of 2002, 3,713 people identified as Egyptian, while in the Serbian census of 2002 (excluding Kosovo), 814 people identified as Egyptian. In the Montenegrin census, on the other hand, 225 people identified as Egyptian.

Ashkali are predominant in the central and eastern regions of Kosovo: Ferizaj, Fushë Kosova, and Lipjan. Kosovo's Egyptian community is mostly to be found in its western part: in Gjakova, Istog, Peja, and Deçan. The Ashkali as well as the Egyptian community of Kosovo had 98% unemployment in 2009.

In Albania, however, the Balkan Egyptian community is fully integrated into Albanian society and culture, having a high educational and employment rate as well, although a good percentage of the community do not identify as Balkan Egyptian due to cultural integration. Despite the fact that most Balkan Egyptians tend to have typical Mediterranean features, fair skin and light features are not uncommon.

Culture

Marriages between Balkan Egyptians and Albanians are more frequent than marriages between Roma and Albanians, while marriages between Balkan Egyptians and Romani people are rare. In Albania, Balkan Egyptians are fully integrated into Albanian culture and have followed their regional traditions and customs.

In Kosovo, on the other hand, Roma and Ashkalia do not classify one another as gadje. The Ashkali and Roma claim the Egyptians as their own; whereas the Ashkali and Egyptians dispute over each other's background.  No television or radio channels are dedicated to Kosovo's Ashkali or Egyptian minority audiences.

See also
 Copts
 Albanians in Egypt
 Democratic Ashkali Party of Kosovo
 Egyptian Liberal Party

Notes

References

Footnotes

Cited works 
Dragan Novaković, Potomci faraona u Srbiji, DT Magazin, 4. April 1998.

External links

NEW ETHNIC IDENTITIES IN THE BALKANS: THE CASE OF THE EGYPTIANS 
Differences of prejudices and collective blames toward to the Balkan’s Egyptians
Egjiptianëve Kosovarë
Union of Balkan's Egyptians
The New Democratic Initiative of Kosovo (Iniciativa e re Demokrarike e Kosovës)
New Democratic Initiative of Kosovo, based in Switzerland
 Minority Rights Group
 Ashkali flag at FAME

 
Ethnic groups in the Balkans
Ethnic groups in Kosovo
Ethnic groups in Albania
Ethnic groups in Serbia
Ethnic groups in Vojvodina
Muslim communities in Europe